Ab Shuri (also Romanized as Ābshūrī, Āb Shūrī, and Āb Shūrī; also known as Ābshūr) is a village in Sudlaneh Rural District, in the Central District of Quchan County, Razavi Khorasan Province, Iran. At the 2006 census, its population was 516, in 138 families.

See also 

 List of cities, towns and villages in Razavi Khorasan Province

References 

Populated places in Quchan County